Barracuda 945 is a naval thriller written in 2003 by Patrick Robinson. It is the sixth book to feature Arnold Morgan as a main character. The book follows Major Ray Kerman as he attempts to "acquire a nuclear submarine, train a crew, sail the Pacific and bring the United States to its knees."

Critical reception
Al Hutchison of The Tampa Tribune called the book a "gripping tale".

References

2003 novels
Techno-thriller novels